The Nestorian schism (431) was a split between the Christian churches of Sassanid Persia, which affiliated with Nestorius, and those that later became the Catholic and Orthodox churches. The schism rose out of a Christological dispute, notably involving Cyril (Patriarch of Alexandria) and Nestorius (Patriarch of Constantinople). 

The First Council of Ephesus in 431 and the Council of Chalcedon in 451 condemned Nestorius and his doctrine, which emphasized the radical distinctness between Christ's human and divine natures. That forced a breach between the churches that defended Nestorius and the state church of the Roman Empire, which caused the Church of the East, the Christian church of Sassanid Persia, to become known as the Nestorian Church, as it took the side of Nestorius.

History
The doctrine of Nestorianism is associated with Nestorius, the Patriarch of Constantinople from 428 to 431. Prior to becoming Patriarch, Nestorius had been a student of Theodore of Mopsuestia at the School of Antioch. Nestorius argued that Christ's human and divine natures were distinct and so he was against using the title Theotokos (Greek: "God bearer") for the Virgin Mary. He preferred to call her Christotokos ("Christ bearer"). Cyril of Alexandria considered the doctrine contrary to Orthodox teaching and encouraged measures against it.

Finally, Nestorius and his doctrine were condemned at the First Council of Ephesus in 431, which was reiterated at the Council of Chalcedon in 451.

Afterward, churches aligned with Nestorius were centred on the School of Edessa and were separated from the rest of the Christian Church. Anathemised in the Roman Empire, they relocated to the Sassanid Empire, where they were welcomed by Persian Christians, who had already declared independence of Constantinople in an attempt to cast off accusations of foreign allegiance.

The School of Edessa relocated to the Mesopotamian city of Nisibis. The School of Nisibis thereafter became a centre of Nestorianism. In 484, the Sassanids executed the pro-Byzantine Catholicos Babowai and enabled the Nestorian bishop of Nisibis, Barsauma, to increase his influence over the bishops of the region. That effectively ended links between Persian Christianity and the Roman Empire.

Thereafter, Nestorianism spread widely through Asia, gaining a presence in India, Central Asia, the Mongol territories, and China. The medieval Nestorian movement survives in the Assyrian Church of the East, most widely in Iraq, Syria and Iran.

References
 

Schisms in Christianity
Church of the East
Assyrian Church of the East
Christianity in the Sasanian Empire
5th-century Christianity
430s in the Byzantine Empire
431